The Journal of Human Lactation is a peer-reviewed medical journal that covers research on human lactation and breastfeeding behavior. The editor-in-chief is Joan E. Dodgson (Saint Louis University). The journal was established in 1985 and is published by SAGE Publications. It is the official journal of the International Lactation Consultant Association.

Abstracting and indexing
The journal is abstracted and indexed in CAB Abstracts, Global Health, Tropical Diseases Bulletin, CINAHL, EMBASE/Excerpta Medica, Food Science and Technology Abstracts, InfoTrac, MEDLINE, Science Citation Index Expanded, Scopus, Current Contents/Clinical Medicine. According to the Journal Citation Reports, the journal has a 2015 impact factor of 2.233.

References

External links

International Lactation Consultant Association

SAGE Publishing academic journals
English-language journals
Pediatrics journals
Quarterly journals
Publications established in 1984